is a common masculine Japanese given name.

Possible writings
Junji can be written using different kanji characters and can mean:

純二, "chaste, two"
 純次, "chaste, next"
 純治, "chaste, govern"
 淳司, "pure, conduct"
 淳次, "pure, next"
 準二, "conform, two"
 准次, "associate, next"
 順二, "sequence, two"
 順治, "sequence, govern"
 潤次, "moisture, next"
The name can also be written in hiragana or katakana.

Real people
 Junji Arias (born 1976), Filipino singer and songwriter
 Junji C. (順冶, born 1985) Filipino pokerstar player
 Junji Chiba (順二, 1926-1988), Japanese voice actor
 Junji Hirata (淳嗣, born 1956), Japanese professional wrestler
 Junji Ishiwatari (born 1977), Japanese musician, and former guitarist and songwriter for the Japanese rock band Supercar
 Junji Ito (潤二, born 1963), Japanese horror manga artist
 Junji Kinoshita (順二, 1914–2006), Japanese playwright
 Junji Majima (淳司, born 1978), Japanese voice actor
 Junji Nishimura (純二, born 1955), Japanese animation director and producer
 Junji Tanigawa (born 1965), Japanese artist and designer
 Junji Sakamoto (順治, born 1957), Japanese film director
 Junji Shimizu, (淳児) anime director
 Junji Takada (純次, born 1947), Japanese actor and comedian
 , Japanese boxer
 Junji Yamaoka, Japanese voice actor

Characters
 Junji Manda (じゅんじ), a character in the anime series Ojamajo Doremi
 Junji, a character in the Adventures on the Orange Islands season of the Pokémon anime series. Known in the dub as Gulzar.

Japanese masculine given names